Le grida del silenzio is a 2018 Italian thriller film directed by Sasha Alessandra Carlesi.

Cast

References

External links

2018 films
2010s Italian-language films
2018 thriller films
Italian thriller films
2010s Italian films